Setoropica laosensis is a species of beetle in the family Cerambycidae, and the only species in the genus Setoropica. It was described by Stephan von Breuning in 1964.

References

Apomecynini
Beetles described in 1964
Monotypic beetle genera